Howard Jacque Hunter III is a former member of the North Carolina House of Representatives who represented the state's 5th House district (including constituents in Gates, Hertford, and Pasquotank counties) from 2015 to 2023. A Democrat, Hunter was first elected to the legislature in 2014. He was re-elected in 2016, 2018, and 2020, but he lost re-election in 2022.

Hunter is the son of the late Rep. Howard J. Hunter Jr. and is the nephew of former U.S. Secretary of Agriculture Mike Espy.

Electoral history

2022

2020

2018

2016

2014

Committee assignments

2021-2022 session
Agriculture
Transportation
Health
Ethics
Rules, Calendar, and Operations of the House Committee
Finance
Families, Children, and Aging Policy Committee (Chair)

2019-2020 session
Appropriations 
Appropriations - Information Technology Committee
Agriculture (Vice Chair)
Transportation
Health 
Ethics 
Rules, Calendar, and Operations of the House

2017-2018 session
Appropriations
Appropriations - Agriculture and Natural and Economic Resources
Agriculture
Elections and Ethics Law
Transportation
Education - K-12
Health
University Board of Governors Nominations

2015-2016 session
Appropriations
Appropriations - Health and Human Services
Agriculture
Commerce and Job Development
Elections
Judiciary IV
Transportation

References

Living people
Democratic Party members of the North Carolina House of Representatives
African-American state legislators in North Carolina
21st-century American politicians
Year of birth missing (living people)
21st-century African-American politicians